Nikos Christodoulakis (born 1952) is a Greek politician, economics professor and electronics engineer. He was the Minister for Economy and Finance of Greece from 2001 to 2004.

Early life and education
Born in Chania, Crete. Nicos Christodoulakis attended the Gymnasium and Lyceum in Zografou, Athens. In 1970, he received the First Award in the competition by the Hellenic Mathematical Society. He studied in the Faculty of Electrical Engineering at the National Technical University of Athens, and graduated in 1975. During his studies, he actively participated in the resistance movement against the military dictatorship that culminated in the Athens Polytechnic uprising in November 1973. After the fall of the dictatorship, he was elected as chairman of the Students’ Association of the Faculty (1974-1975). In 1976, he testified at the Athens Martial Court against the junta leaders charged with the invasion to the Polytechnic occupation in 1973. In 1977-1979, he completed his military service in the Engineers Corps. During 1974-1980, he worked as a consultant engineer in construction and manufacturing companies, and as adjunct professor in the Technological Institutions (TEI) in Kozani and Athens.
Receiving a scholarship from the State Scholarship Foundation (IKY) and the British Council, he attended postgraduate studies at the University of Cambridge (1980-1984), obtaining an MPhil in Control Systems Theory and a PhD on policy design under uncertainty. Member of the Darwin College, Cambridge.https://www.aueb.gr/el/faculty_page/%CE%A7%CF%81%CE%B9%CF%83%CF%84%CE%BF%CE%B4%CE%BF%CF%85%CE%BB%CE%B1%CE%BA%CE%B7%CF%82-%CE%9D%CE%B9%CE%BA%CE%BF%CE%BB%CE%B1%CE%BF%CF%82

Academic career
Over the following years he worked as a consultant engineer in some companies (1974–1980) he became a teaching professor at the Technological Educational Institutes (TEI) in Greece (1977–1980), a Senior Research Officer at the University of Cambridge (1984–1986), an Assistant Professor at the Athens University of Economics (1986–1989), a Fellow at the European University Institute in Florence (1989–1990), a Visiting Professor at the University of Cyprus (1996), a Visiting Professor at the Charles University in Prague (1992–1993) and the Vice-Rector of the Athens University of Economics and Business (1992–1994), where he's also a teacher since 1990 up to present, currently teaching at the Department of International & European Economic Studies of the university. He was also a researcher in the Tinbergen Institute, the London School of Economics and the Centre for Economic Policy Research, and has also published many economy-related academic books and articles over the last three decades.

Political career
His political career began in 1993, when he became a Secretary General for Research and Technology for three years until 1996, when he was appointed as an Economic advisor to the Prime Minister. From 1999 to 2007 he was elected as a member of the Greek Parliament with the Socialist Party of Greece (PASOK). He was the Deputy Minister of Finance for four years (1996–2000), the Minister for Development for one year (2000–2001) and, in 2001, he became the Minister for Economy and Finance of Greece for three years, up to 2004. Furthermore, he was the Chairman of the Eurogroup from June 2002 to July 2003, participating in international meetings with G7, the World Bank and International Monetary Fund, and the Chairman of the Economic and Financial Affairs Council (ECOFIN) in the European Union, during the Greek presidency (January–June 2003).

External links 
Biographical sketch at Athens University of Economics and Business website

|-

|-

1952 births
Academics of the London School of Economics
Academics of the University of Cambridge
Alumni of Darwin College, Cambridge
Academic staff of the Athens University of Economics and Business
Academic staff of Charles University
Academic staff of the European University Institute
Academic staff of the National Technical University of Athens
Greek MPs 2000–2004
Greek MPs 2004–2007
Finance ministers of Greece
Government ministers of Greece
Living people
National Technical University of Athens alumni
PASOK politicians
People from Chania (regional unit)